The Underbelly is a venue at the Edinburgh Festival Fringe off Cowgate. From 2001-2004, Underbelly was the only venue operated by Underbelly Limited. In 2005, Underbelly added the Baby Belly venue. In 2006, these venues were joined by the E4 UdderBELLY and the Cow Barn.

History of the Underbelly

Underbelly was first opened in 2000, as a small performance venue for five shows brought to the Fringe by Double Edge Drama. The Double Edge directors had heard of the venue through a production of Gargantua, performed by the Scottish company, Grid Iron in the vaults below the central library of Edinburgh. The site was discovered by Judith Doherty and named 'Underbelly' by Judith and Ben Harrison. Grid Iron staged a show there. The location's and Double Edge's shows won a Fringe First for its critically acclaimed productions of Bent and Marat Sade.

In 2001, "Underbelly Limited" and "By Popular Demand Productions Limited" were set up to turn the Underbelly into a professional venue with a number of performance spaces and a wide range of productions. The venue was set up with performance spaces in the Iron Belly, White Belly and Big Belly. The Belly Laugh (then named the Belly Bar) was also used for late night cabaret as well as the venue's second bar. Space downstairs which is now used for Belly Dance was used to exhibit a film installation by Nick Hornby.

In 2002, The Underbelly was renamed The Smirnoff Underbelly. The number of performance spaces was increased to include the Belly Button and Belly Laugh comedy venues and a third bar, the Jelly Belly, to the first floor. The number of shows increased from 18 to over 50. In 2003, the Belly Dancer was soundproofed to ensure that it can be used throughout the day without disrupting other performances. This allowed Underbelly to team up with Forth One 97.3 to host a series of free live music gigs every night in the Belly Dancer, known as the Forth One Fringe. These gigs have included Mark Owen, Ocean Colour Scene and Skin and Keane In 2004, the Delhi Belly space was added. The bars were rearranged to create more space and ease congestion and queuing. Finally, a brand new large box office was created in one of the rooms off the front alley, which freed up the old box office to become a larger and more usable publicity office with a sofa and coffee. The shows at the Underbelly venue won a record number of awards, including the Perrier Award for Jackson's Way; Fringe First Awards for The Ignatius Trail, Manchester Girl and The Jammer; Perrier Newcomer Nomination for Joanna Neary in Joanna Neary is Not Feeling Herself; and an Amnesty Award nomination for Someone Who'll Watch Over Me.

In 2005, Underbelly was joined by the Baby Belly on Niddry Street, just off Cowgate, a two-minute walk from the original venue. The number of shows was now up to 140 spread over the three weeks of the Edinburgh Fringe.

Performers at Underbelly
Performers who have appeared at Underbelly over the years include
Stewart Lee, writer of Jerry Springer - The Opera
Waen Shepherd
Will Adamsdale aka Chris John Jackson in Jackson's Way
Lucy Porter
Janey Godley
Andrew O'Neill
Rain Pryor
Robin Ince
Stephen K Amos
Ricky Tomlinson
Joan Rivers
Russell Howard
The Penny Dreadfuls
Simon Bird
Craig Campbell
Frisky and Mannish
The Fitzrovia Radio Hour
EastEnd Cabaret
Quattro Formaggio
Beardyman
Willis & Vere

See also
Underbelly Ltd.
Edinburgh Fringe
Edinburgh Festival

References

External links
Underbelly's website
The Scotsman article on Underbelly

Edinburgh Festival
Theatres in Edinburgh